The Kripalu Center for Yoga & Health is a nonprofit organization that operates a health and yoga retreat in Stockbridge, Massachusetts. Its  facility is a former Jesuit novitiate and juniorate seminary built in 1957.

History
Founder Amrit Desai came from India in 1960 as a student at the Philadelphia College of Art and taught yoga in Philadelphia. In 1966, he co-founded the Yoga Society of Pennsylvania.
 In 1972, Desai set up a residential yoga center in Sumneytown, Pennsylvania. 
In 1974, the organization's name was changed to "Kripalu Yoga Fellowship". It taught Swami Kripalvananda's teachings, held retreats and other programs, and trained yoga teachers. In 1975, Kripalu bought Summit Station, Pennsylvania, including a health center that became a key element of its mission. In 1977, Swami Kripalu moved to the United States, inspiring many people to take up yoga. He returned to India in 1981. The current Stockbridge, Massachusetts location, a former Jesuit seminary on a property called Shadowbrook, opened in December 1983. During the 1980s, Kripalu grew to have over 350 residents. In 1994, it was discovered that Desai had had sexual relationships with female residents and resigned. In 1999, Kripalu changed from a religious order to a secular non-profit organisation.

As of 2008, Kripalu offered more than 750 programs and spiritual retreats attended by about 25,000 people annually. Total annual visitation was reported to be about 30,000 people. Many workshops are conducted by outside presenters. Kripalu Center also offers a semester-long program for young adults; projects in music, weight loss and post-traumatic stress disorder. Independent "Kripalu" instructors pay training and certification fees, in return obtaining liability insurance and other business and marketing support.

The center employed about 626 people as of 2008 and could accommodate more than 650 overnight guests. Kripalu hosted over 700 programs a year in its Schools of Yoga, Ayurveda, and Integrative Yoga Therapy; its Institute of Extraordinary Living, founded by Kripalu's scholar-in-residence Stephen Cope; and its conscious leadership program. Kripalu Center's 2019 revenue was $37.24 million. 

In 2020, Kripalu closed due to the COVID-19 pandemic, reopening in 2021.

Kripalu Yoga
Kripalu Yoga is a form of Hatha Yoga with elements of kundalini yoga that combines asanas, pranayama, and meditation. Kripalu states that its teaching is "following the flow" of prana, or "life-force energy, compassionate self-acceptance, observing the activity of the mind without judgment, and taking what is learned into daily life."

Facility

Kripalu's , include forests, lawns, gardens, and access to Lake Mahkeenac. Conservation easements on 225 of the acres were granted in 1997 using a framework of the U.S. Forest Legacy Program.

Kripalu's principal  building was constructed by the Jesuits in 1957 to replace the Gilded Age mansion "Shadowbrook Cottage." The Jesuits had planned to demolish the mansion due to high maintenance costs, but prior to demolition, the mansion was destroyed by a fire in 1956 which resulted in several fatalities. Jesuits had acquired the former estate in 1922 as a novitiate, but moved away in 1970.

A $15 million, six-story housing annex with 80 guest rooms, was completed in 2010. Designed by architect Peter Rose, the annex incorporates sustainable design elements and won a 2010 award for specialized housing from the American Institute of Architects. The institute commented on the building's interior natural lighting, and noted that the architectural design and climate control systems are integrated and consume 40 percent less energy than a conventional building. Rose also developed a master plan for increasing the center's capacity and developing it into "a model of environmental responsibility" through improvements to existing buildings, landscaping, and new construction.

Kripalu Center for Yoga & Health formerly operated its own water supply. Groundwater from onsite wells was used for its water supply source, supplemented by water purchased from the Lenox water department. There were regulatory agency "concerns" resulting in at least two enforcement actions about the water supply's potential vulnerability to contamination, and as of 2009 the center's water supply had been converted to rely solely on purchased water obtained from surface water sources.

References

Further reading
Richard Faulds (2005), Kripalu Yoga: A Guide to Practice On and Off the Mat, Bantam Books. 
James Abro (2011), An American Yoga: The Kripalu Story, Aerodale Press.

External links

Swami Kripalvananda

Yoga schools
Modern Denominational Yoga
Stockbridge, Massachusetts
Educational institutions established in 1983
Buildings and structures in Berkshire County, Massachusetts
Tourist attractions in Berkshire County, Massachusetts
Spiritual retreats
Sports in Berkshire County, Massachusetts
1983 establishments in Massachusetts